Alona Rodeh is a visual artist. Her work spans a variety of media including sculpture, video, immersive installations using light and sound, photography, and publishing.

Biography 
Born and raised in Israel, Rodeh received her BFA from the Bezalel Academy of Arts and Design, Jerusalem in 2003, and participated in the BFA exchange program of the Academy of Fine Arts, Vienna. She completed her MFA at the Tel Aviv campus of Bezalel in 2009, spending a semester at the Sculpture Department of the Royal College of Art, London. Rodeh  lives and works in Berlin.

Work 
Expanding on sculpture, and applying her experience as a set designer for theater, Rodeh has created large-scale, often room-spanning installations. She combines light, movement, and sound in a manner she describes as performance without performers, delivering time-based experiences.

Rodeh is known for her Safe and Sound Project where she explores histories of off-the-shelf reflective and fluorescent illumination technologies.

Solo exhibitions (selection) 

Architecture of The Nights, Kunstpalais Erlangen, 2019
DARK AGES 2020, Salzburger Kunstverein, 2019
The Runner (LIVE), KOENIG2 by_robbygreif, Vienna, 2017
Safe and Sound (Evolutions), Grimmuseum Berlin, 2015
 Safe and Sound I, Künstlerhaus Bethanien, Berlin, 2014
 Above and Beyond, CCA Tel Aviv, 2013
 The Resurrection of Dead Masters, Plug In Institute of Contemporary Art, Winnipeg, 2012
 The Etheric Body, Petach Tikva Museum of Art, 2011

Group exhibitions (selection) 
In the Spotlight of the Night: Life in the Gloom, Marta Herford, 2019
Showtime, Helena Rubinstein Pavilion for Contemporary Art, Tel Aviv Museum of Art, 2013

Awards and Residencies (selection) 
Rodeh was the recipient of the 2011 Young Artist Prize from the Israeli Ministry of Culture and Sport. She also won various stipends from Stiftung Kunstfonds Bonn (2019), the Berlin Senate for Culture and Europe (2019, 2017), the Israel Lottery Council for Culture and Arts (2014, 2012), Artis (2013, 2010, 2008), Rabinovich Foundation (2013, 2012) Outset Israel (2013) and the Ostrovsky Family Fund (2013) and others. Fellowships included, among others, a six months residency at the Berlin Fire Brigade (in the frame of KUNSTrePUBLIK and ZK/U Artist Dis-Placement Residency), and a year-long residency at Künstlerhaus Bethanien, Berlin.

Rodeh is represented by Christine König Galerie, Vienna and Rosenfeld Gallery, Tel Aviv.

Books 
  With contributions by Deiss, Amely; Esteve, Pol; Hood, Raymond M.; Kealy, Séamus; Kroeger, Malte; Lam, William MC; Rodeh, Alona; and Wiggam, Marc.
  With contributions by Karjevsky, Gilly; Schöder, Thore; McCleary, Kristen; Hensler, Bruce; and Meinhoff, Ulrike.
  With contributions by Atwan, Shachar; Gallanti, Fabrizio; and Schwartz, Hillel.
  With contributions by Tamir, Chen; Rodeh, Alona; and Brand, Roy.

References

Further reading

External links 
 Alona Rodeh's website

1979 births
Living people
21st-century Israeli women artists
Israeli women sculptors
21st-century Israeli sculptors
Israeli video artists
Israeli installation artists